Theodor Zacharias Friedrich Alt (23 January 1846 – 8 October 1937) was a German painter.

Life 
He was born in Döhlau. The son of Döhlau's pastor, Alt received his earliest education from his parents, and later attended the Old Latin School in Regensburg, where his father was head of the Protestant community from 1856 to 1870.

From 1861 to 1863, he studied at the Academy of Fine Arts, Nuremberg then, upon the recommendation of his teachers, moved to the Academy of Fine Arts Munich. He initially studied with Hermann Anschütz, followed by Arthur von Ramberg from 1866 to 1873. In 1869, he joined with former classmates Wilhelm Leibl, Rudolf Hirth du Frênes and Johann Sperl to share a studio. Together, they formed the core of an artists' group that would come to be known as the "Leibl-Kreis" (Leibl Circle).

As was true of everyone in the Circle, Alt was heavily influenced by Liebl and was never able to step entirely out of his shadow. In 1873, he moved to Petersaurach to set up an independent studio, but the onset of mental illness three years later forced him to temporarily stop painting.

Despite some brief improvement, he found it necessary to live in Adelshofen with his mother from 1878 to 1884. He produced very little work, however, as he was tormented by insomnia, hallucinations and violent impulses that led to several stays at the psychiatric hospital in Erlangen.

In 1884, he and his mother moved to Rothenburg, where better medical care was available. After his mother's death in 1901, he moved to Ansbach, living with a pastor's widow who served as his nurse. He remained there until his death at the age of 91, still producing the occasional watercolor of the local landscape.

Most of his estate is in the possession of the Reichsstadtmuseum Rothenburg.

References

Further reading
 Theodor Köberlin: Ansbach alt, von Theodor Alt gesehen. Hercynia, Ansbach 1988, .
 Theodor Köberlin: Romantisches Rothenburg und seine Umgebung. Förg, Rosenheim 1981, .
 Theodor Köberlin: "Theodor Alt (1846–1937). Ein Maler, dem Mittelfranken zur Heimat wurde". In: Jahrbuch des Historischen Vereins für Mittelfranken. 91 (1982/83), pp.187–235.
 Michael Petzet: Wilhelm Leibl und sein Kreis (exhibition catalog), Prestel, München 1974, .
 Eberhard Ruhmer: Der Leibl-Kreis und die Reine Malerei. Rosenheimer Verlagshaus, Rosenheim 1984, .

External links 

 
 

1846 births
1937 deaths
German genre painters
People from Hof (district)
19th-century German painters
19th-century German male artists
German male painters
20th-century German painters
20th-century German male artists